Joseph Gerhard Zuccarini (10 August 1797 – 18 February 1848) was a German botanist, Professor of Botany at the University of Munich. He worked extensively with Philipp Franz von Siebold, assisting in describing his collections from Japan, but also described plants discovered in other areas, including Mexico. Siebold wrote his Flora Japonica in collaboration with Zuccarini. It first appeared in 1835, but the work was not completed until after his death, finished in 1870 by F. A. W. Miquel (1811–1871), director of the Rijksherbarium in Leiden.

The botanical genus Zuccarinia (Rubiaceae) was named in his honor by Carl Ludwig Blume in 1827.

References 

Botanists with author abbreviations
1797 births
1848 deaths
Botanists active in Japan
Botanists active in North America
19th-century German botanists